Ankylopoda was a proposed clade that hypothetically contains turtles and lepidosaurs (tuatara, lizards and snakes) and their fossil relatives. This clade is supported based on microRNAs as well as the fossil record. However, it was strongly contradicted by molecular evidence which supports Archelosauria.

Classification 
The cladogram below follows the most likely result found by another analysis of turtle relationships, this one using only fossil evidence, published by Rainer Schoch and Hans-Dieter Sues in 2015. This study found Eunotosaurus to be an actual early stem-turtle, though other versions of the analysis found weak support for it as a parareptile.

See also
 Archelosauria, an alternative clade that places turtles as sister taxon to archosaurs.

References

Reptile taxonomy